Gach (also Romanized as Gāch; also known as Kāj and Kaj) is a village in Beyhaq Rural District, Sheshtomad District, Sabzevar County, Razavi Khorasan Province, Iran. At the 2006 census, its population was 294, in 103 families.

References 

Populated places in Sabzevar County